Goal! Another Goal! is a 1968 Soviet comedy film directed by Viktor Sadovsky.

Plot 
The film shows the final football match in Leningrad between the Leningrad Zarya team and the West European Reefs. The son of the Zarya coach went to visit one girl before the match and he returned only in the morning, which is why he was suspended from participation in the game. suddenly one player is injured and Sergey replaces him.

Cast 
 Viktor Korshunov as Coach Tamantsev
 Valentin Smirnitskiy as Sergei Tamantsev
 Galina Yatskina as Zhenya Strumilina
 Boris Bystrov as Anatoli Starodub
 Vladimir Kenigson as Manager Khomutayev
 Nikolay Zaseev-Rudenko as Captain Krutilin (as N. Zaseev)
 Vladimir Treshchalov as Konstantin Malkov
 Aleksandr Grave as Kesha Fedorin

References

External links 
 

1968 films
1960s Russian-language films
Soviet comedy films
1968 comedy films